Novoalexandrovsky (masculine), Novoalexandrovskaya (feminine), or Novoalexandrovskoye (neuter) may refer to:
Novoalexandrovsky District, a district of Stavropol Krai, Russia
Novoalexandrovsky (rural locality) (Novoalexandrovskaya, Novoalexandrovskoye), several rural localities in Russia